Bipin Karki (born 21 August 1982 in Bahuni, Nepal) is a Nepalese film and theatre actor known for his work in Nepali cinema.

Karki began his career at a young age by appearing in stage plays with his brother Arjun Karki. Karki performed stage plays with Kamal Mani Nepal and his guru Sunil Pokharel at Gurukul Theatre in Kathmandu in 2005. As a screen actor, he first appeared in Loot (2012) as a Gangster (short role) and then had a role in Chhadke (2013). He rose to prominence after starring in Pashupati Prasad in a villain role and won a National Film Award.

Early life and family 
Karki was born on 21 August 1982 in Bahuni, Morang District, Nepal. In 2016, he married Reshma Katuwal and they have a daughter.

Acting career 
From a young age, Karki appeared in various stage plays in his hometown, Bahuni. Then he moved to Kathmandu, Nepal, to appear in theatre plays. He acted with his friend from his village, Kamal Mani Nepal, now a Nepalese actor. After appearing in a few theatre plays, he met Sunil Pokharel, who helped him improve his acting skills. He joined Gurukul Theatre in 2005.

He appeared in Nischal Basnet's Loot (2012) in a short role as a Gangster. He then acted in Chhadke (2013), appearing in a lead role as Bindu.

In 2014 he appeared in Suntali (2014) as Bidur. Karki rose to fame after appearing in Pashupati Prasad (2016) and won many awards after the film's release, including the National Film Award. Then he appeared in Jatra (2016) in the lead role; the film became one of the successful films of Karki's career and he won 9th Dcine Award for the best actor.

In 2018, he starred in Hari. The same year, he also appeared in Gopi.

Filmography

Awards and nominations

References

External links 
 
 

1982 births
21st-century Nepalese male actors
Living people
Nepalese actors
Nepalese male film actors
Nepalese male stage actors
People from Biratnagar
Ratna Rajya Laxmi Campus alumni
Male actors in Hindi cinema